These are the official results of the men's 4 × 400 metres relay event at the 1996 Summer Olympics in Atlanta, United States. There were 35 nations competing.

United States ran the event without their top two qualifiers from the Olympic Trials.  world record holder Butch Reynolds was injured before the games and 400 meters gold medalist Michael Johnson was injured during his 200 metres 19.32 world record.

Seizing the opportunity of a weakened US squad, Britain's Iwan Thomas shot out to a lead from the gun putting a big gap on USA's Lamont Smith to his inside.  Reality set in and Thomas began to tie up toward the end of his leg, allowing Smith to gain back to almost even with Thomas by the handoff, with Michael McDonald putting Jamaica into third position.  Alvin Harrison ran a solid turn and looked to put America in the lead at the break, but Jamie Baulch sprinted past him on the outside to put the Brits back in the lead.  Harrison held his position behind Baulch all the way until the end of the second turn, with Greg Haughton bringing Jamaica into the three-team breakaway for the medals.  Harrison steadily gained on the last half of the turn pulling even by the straightaway, then cleanly separated, putting USA in the lead.  Haughton followed Harrison around Baulch running down lane 2 trying to catch Harrison.  USA and GBR exchanged cleanly on the inside, but as Haughton handed off to Roxbert Martin, they crossed legs with Martin coming out doing a full somersault, Jamaica losing a couple of steps on Derek Mills leading for the Americans, with Mark Richardson in hot pursuit.  Richardson pulled in the gap to Mills, looking poised to pounce coming off the final turn, but Mills held him off and pulled away down the straight.  Mills handed off to  Anthuan Maybank, whose selection to the U.S. team was controversial.  Maybank was not selected for the individual race because he had been disqualified for a lane violation in the Olympic Trials.  Normally, the top six finishers would be selected and he technically did not finish.  Now in the absence of Johnson and Reynolds, he was thrust into the potential hero's role of anchoring the American team.  With a three-meter deficit to make up, Britain's silver medalist Roger Black had other ideas.  Black steadily gained on Maybank and was in perfect position to pass coming off the final turn.  But Maybank never let him by, lifting his knees and pulling away from Black to bring USA home with a four-metre victory for the gold medal.  Davian Clarke brought Jamaica home for bronze three seconds later.  Behind the medalists, Senegal made a terrible final handoff behind Japan, leaving them even with Poland on the final lap.  Ibou Faye made up the deficit, passing Japan's Shigekazu Ōmori and finished setting a new National Record that survived two decades.

Medalists

* Athletes who participated in the heats only and received medals.

Records
These were the standing world and Olympic records (in minutes) prior to the 1996 Summer Olympics.

Results

Heats
Qualification: First 2 in each heat (Q) and the next 6 fastest (q) qualified to the semifinals.

Semifinals
Qualification: First 4 in each heat (Q) qualified directly to the final.

Final

See also
Women's 4 × 400 m Relay

References

External links
 Official Report
 Results

R
Relay foot races at the Olympics
Men's events at the 1996 Summer Olympics